Tân Phước is a rural district (huyện) of Tien Giang province in the Mekong Delta region of Vietnam. As of 2018 the district had a population of 63,032. The district covers an area of 333.21 km². The district capital lies at Mỹ Phước.

References

Districts of Tiền Giang province